The Emerson–Laver rivalry was a tennis rivalry between Roy Emerson and Rod Laver. The two Queenslanders first met on the senior amateur tour in 1958 and dominated the amateur circuit until 1962, before Laver went pro. When open tennis arrived in 1968, Emerson went pro and resumed his prolific rivalry with Laver.

Analysis 
The statistics shows a strong dominance of Laver over Emerson, two years his senior. He dominated him in the amateur era and the open era over all surfaces. Emerson spent his best years in the amateur circuit, and during 5 years he could not face Laver.

Head-to-head tallies
The following is a breakdown of their documented head-to-head results:

All Matches: Laver 51-21
All Finals: Laver 22–10
Grand Slams: Laver 7–2

List of all matches

See also
List of tennis rivalries

Sources
 Joe McCauley, The History of Professional Tennis, London 2001
 World Tennis (The US Magazine)
 World of Tennis (Annuals edited by John Barrett)

Tennis rivalries
Sports rivalries in Australia